Kristoffer Skjerping (born 4 May 1993) is a Norwegian former professional road racing cyclist, who rode professionally between 2012 and 2019 for the ,  (over two spells) and  teams.

Biography
Born on 4 May 1993, in Bergen, Norway, Skjerping spent his adolescence in Sotra, Norway. Skjerping resides in Gjerdrum, Norway.

Major results
Sources:

2010
 2nd Road race, National Junior Road Championships
 5th Overall Niedersachsen Rundfahrt Juniors
2011
 National Junior Road Championships
1st  Time trial
3rd Road race
2012
 2nd Ringerike GP
2013
 1st  Road race, National Under-23 Road Championships
 9th Ringerike GP
2014
 1st Stage 1 Tour de l'Avenir
 2nd Paris–Troyes
 2nd Ronde Van Vlaanderen Beloften
 3rd  Road race, UCI Under-23 Road World Championships
 3rd Ringerike GP
2016
 1st Stage 1 (TTT) Czech Cycling Tour
2017
 3rd Time trial, National Road Championships
 5th Grand Prix de la Ville de Lillers
 5th Grote Prijs Stad Zottegem
 7th Overall Tour de Bretagne
2018
 3rd Time trial, National Road Championships
2019
 1st Ringerike GP
 1st Gylne Gutuer
 7th Himmerland Rundt

References

External links

Cycling Base: Kristoffer Skjerping
Cycling Quotient: Kristoffer Skjerping

Cannondale-Garmin: Kristoffer Skjerping

1993 births
Living people
Norwegian male cyclists
People from Gjerdrum
Sportspeople from Bergen